Meshach Dreams Back is a studio album by Canadian singer songwriter Jane Siberry. The album is the third part of a project dubbed the Three Queens Trilogy.

Track listing
All tracks written by Jane Siberry.

Act 1: Call Magic – 5:20
Act 2: When We Are a Vampire – 2:48		
Act 3: Meshach Dreams Back – 5:10		
Act 4: We Could Have Been Great Friends – 1:56		
Act 5: Above the Portico – 4:15			
Act 6: The Alchemy of the Everyday – 3:23			
Act 7: The Village Fair – 1:40		
Act 8: An Invitation to Be Well – 1:00	
Act 9: Imagine a World –  5:44

References

Jane Siberry albums
2011 albums